Mateja Andrlić (born 25 December 1993) is a Croatian football forward who plays for ŽNK Osijek.

Honours 
ŽNK Osijek
Winner
 Croatian First League (5): 2010–11, 2011–12, 2012–13, 2013–14, 2014–15

External links 
 
 

1993 births
Living people
Croatian women's footballers
Croatia women's international footballers
Women's association football forwards
Croatian Women's First Football League players
ŽNK Osijek players